La Chaussade is a commune in the Creuse department in the Nouvelle-Aquitaine region in central France.

Geography

The Voueize has its source in the commune.

Population

Sights
 The thirteenth century church.
 The three châteaux of Baboneix, Le Rechautier and l'Etang.
 A donjon at Chalard.

See also
Communes of the Creuse department

References

Communes of Creuse